Curtis Trishton Taylor (born July 13, 1985) is an American football safety who is currently a free agent. The San Francisco 49ers drafted him in the seventh round of the 2009 NFL Draft. He played college football at Louisiana State University (LSU). He played high school football at Frankliinton High School in Franklinton, Louisiana.

He also played for the Oakland Raiders, Arizona Cardinals and Sacramento Mountain Lions.

Professional career

San Francisco 49ers
Taylor was drafted in the seventh round, 219th overall pick, by the San Francisco 49ers in the 2009 NFL Draft. He was released by the 49ers on September 3, 2011.

Oakland Raiders
On January 5, 2012, Taylor signed a future/reserve contract with the Oakland Raiders.

Second Stint with 49ers
The 49ers re-signed Taylor to the team's practice squad on December 26, 2012.

Arizona Cardinals
Taylor signed with the Arizona Cardinals on April 3, 2013. He was released on August 30, 2013. After re-signing with the team and spending time on the practice squad, Taylor was elevated to the active roster on December 10, 2013, after a season-ending injury to safety Tyrann Mathieu. The Cardinals released Taylor on August 30, 2014.

Personal life
His younger brother is former San Diego Chargers safety, Brandon Taylor, who was selected by the Chargers in the third round of the 2012 NFL Draft after also playing for Louisiana State.

References

External links

San Francisco 49ers bio
LSU Tigers bio 

1985 births
Living people
People from Bogalusa, Louisiana
Players of American football from Louisiana
American football safeties
LSU Tigers football players
San Francisco 49ers players
Sacramento Mountain Lions players
Arizona Cardinals players